Miris striatus is a Palearctic species of  bugs that constitutes the type species of the type genus of the family Miridae. It has been reported to be a predator of psyllids such as Cacopsylla melanoneura.

References
 

Miridae
Hemiptera of Europe
Palearctic insects
Bugs described in 1758
Taxa named by Carl Linnaeus